was a Japanese Sōtō Zen teacher of the 20th century. He had resided at Antai-ji for eight years from 1949 to 1957 as a student of Kodo Sawaki before moving to Komoro in 1959. He continued his life in the park until his death in 1980.

See also
 Slek leaf whistle or flute as used in Cambodia. Same type of instrument that Sodō Yokoyama played, different culture.

References

External links
Audio of Yokoyama's leaf flute music

1907 births
1980 deaths
People from Sendai